The Häfeli DH-1 was a 1910s Swiss two-seat reconnaissance aircraft, built by the aircraft department of the Federal Construction Works (Eidgenoessische Konstruktionswerkstaette, K+W) at Thun, Switzerland.

Development and design
In 1915 K + W set up their aircraft department and employed August Häfeli as chief engineer. Häfeli had previously designed the AGO C.I and AGO C.II,  German reconnaissance biplanes. His first design was the Häfeli DH-1, similar in concept to his designs for AGO Flugzeugwerke. The DH-1 was a three-bay biplane of wood and fabric construction, it had a fuselage pod with tandem seating for the two-man crew and twin booms mounting the tail. The DH-1 was powered by an Argus As II engine built under licence by Buhler Brothers Limited. Six aircraft were built.

Operational history
Six DH-1s were built during 1916 but within a year three had been destroyed in accidents. The survivors were withdrawn from service in 1919 and scrapped.

Operators

Swiss Air Force

Specifications (DH-1)

References

External links

 ETH-Bibliothek Zürich, Bildarchiv. Häfeli DH-1 (M I) No 243 with Argus As II engine, viewer
 Das Virtuelle Luftfahrtmuseum: K+W DH 1

1910s Swiss military reconnaissance aircraft
Biplanes
Pusher aircraft
Aircraft first flown in 1916
Twin-boom aircraft